Edward "Ed" Considine (born 19 September 1968) is a former Australian rules footballer who played with Essendon and Sydney in the Victorian/Australian Football League (VFL/AFL).

Considine played his early football for St Joseph's and Strathmore. An All-Australian at Teal Cup level, he made his league debut in 1986 but could only put together semi regular games and spent much of his time in the reserves.

Often used as a half back flanker, Considine moved to Sydney in 1993 via a trade and in 1994 played 15 games, his best return. He retired after playing six AFL games in 1995.

References

1968 births
Essendon Football Club players
Sydney Swans players
Strathmore Football Club players
Australian rules footballers from Victoria (Australia)
Living people
People educated at St Joseph's College, Melbourne